National Union (in Spanish: Unión Nacional) was a political party in Peru.

It was originally called the Radical Party (Partido Radical) by one of its founders Manuel González Prada. That name seemed too confrontational to many in the party and thus it became known as the National Union. The party grew out of the Literary Circle and morphed into a political party in 1891.

One of the central reasons it formed was to create a party of ideas, avoiding the cult of personality that guided the more traditional parties. One of the ideas that guided it was the call for greater European immigration to Peru. Such a stance seems to be a paradox because many of its members defended Peru's Quechua speaking citizens. The only way to understand this paradox is to remember that the National Union was partly founded on the ideals of liberalism and that the Spanish language was the language of commerce.

Further reading
 Manuel González Prada, "The Parties and the National Union". In Free Pages and Hard Times: Anarchist Musings. Oxford: Oxford University Press, 2002, 143-164.

Political parties established in 1891
Defunct political parties in Peru